George Adrian "Red" Witt (November 9, 1931 – January 30, 2013), was an American professional baseball player, a right-handed pitcher who played all or part of six seasons in Major League Baseball (1957–62) with the Pittsburgh Pirates, Los Angeles Angels and Houston Colt .45s. He graduated from California State University, Long Beach.

Witt began his baseball career in 1950 as a member of the Brooklyn Dodgers' organization and was drafted by the Pirates from Brooklyn following the 1954 season. In 1957, he won 18 games (losing seven) for the top-level Hollywood Stars of the Pacific Coast League, then had notable back-to-back seasons for the Pirates in 1958–59. In , he helped pitch Pittsburgh to a first division finish and the club's first winning season in a decade with a 9–2 record and a sparkling 1.61 earned run average in 18 games pitched and 15 starting assignments. He threw five complete games and three shutouts. He spent part of  back in minor league baseball.

But he also appeared in ten games (with six starts) for the 1960 National League and World Series champion Pirates. He made three relief appearances in the World Series, which was marked by three lopsided New York Yankees victories and four close Pittsburgh triumphs. Witt appeared in the Yankee routs, Games 2, 3 and 6, and although he was not charged with allowing any runs in 2 innings pitched, he permitted four inherited baserunners to score.

For his MLB career he compiled an 11–16 record with a 4.32 earned run average and 156 strikeouts in 66 appearances and 229 total innings pitched; he allowed 225 hits and 127 bases on balls, and recorded no shutouts or complete games after 1958.

Witt was a high school physical education instructor, a science teacher, and a baseball and tennis coach at Tustin High School in Tustin, California, as well as a former Foreign Study League group leader, where he led high school students through a number of European foreign capitals comparing different governmental systems.

References

External links

1931 births
2013 deaths
Asheville Tourists players
Baseball players from Long Beach, California
California State University, Long Beach alumni
Columbus Jets players
Denver Bears players
Greenwood Dodgers players
Hollywood Stars players
Houston Colt .45s players
Lincoln Chiefs players
Los Angeles Angels players
Major League Baseball pitchers
New Orleans Pelicans (baseball) players
Newport News Dodgers players
Oklahoma City 89ers players
Pittsburgh Pirates players
Pueblo Dodgers players
Salt Lake City Bees players
Santa Barbara Dodgers players
Trois-Rivières Royals players